Henrique Neris de Brito (born 11 May 1987, in São Paulo), known as just Henrique, is a Brazilian footballer.

He has playing for Portuguese side Sport Clube Vila Real. The Portuguese Liga club Rio Ave who bought the striker in 2007 from Brazilian football team Atlético Paranaense. After the releasing by Portuguese side Rio Ave F.C. was a half year without an club, before signed in the Spring of 2010 with Cuiabá Esporte Clube.

References

1987 births
Living people
Brazilian footballers
Footballers from São Paulo

Association football forwards
Rio Ave F.C. players